Leaving Afghanistan is a Russian war film directed and written by Pavel Lungin.

Plot 
Set between 1988 and 1989 in the closing stages of the Soviet-Afghan War, the plot, based upon a true story, centres around the men of the 108th Motor Rifle Division, whose withdrawal from Afghanistan is put on hold to rescue the kidnapped son of a Soviet general by the Mujahideen as a result of a plane crash, fighting their way through the Salang Pass and experiencing the hardship of war along the way.

Cast
 Mikhail Kremer
 Aleksandr Kuznetsov
 Kirill Pirogov	
 Yan Tsapnik

Reception

Controversy
The film was criticized by politicians and Soviet Army veterans for being "unpatriotic", among which Federation Council member Igor Morozov noted the film featuring scenes of Soviet soldiers looting and fighting amongst themselves as being unsuitable for "educating young people with a sense of patriotism", accusing director Pavel Lungin of distorting history. Lungin rejected criticism of the film as being "anti-Russian", stating how it is instead an anti-war film that instead shows "how good guys are sent to fight ugly, pointless wars" and how it promotes conversation about the role of Russia’s armed forces during and after the Cold War period.

Awards
Leaving Afghanistan was entered into the 2019 Shanghai International Film Festival’s Golden Goblet Awards, where writers Aleksandr and Pavel Lungin won the award for Best Screenplay.

References

External links 
 

2010s Russian-language films
Films set in 1989
Soviet–Afghan War films
Films set in Afghanistan
Russian historical action films
Russian action war films
2019 films